The Pan Poëticon Batavum was a collection of small portraits of poets mounted on plates that were kept in a curiosity cabinet by the 18th-century Dutch painter Arnoud van Halen.

History of the collection
Van Halen began assembling his collection around 1700 by painting miniature portraits himself that he copied from engravings. For contemporary poets he enlisted the help of friends and colleagues. Before he died he managed to collect 346 portraits, of which 80 are now in the collection of the Rijksmuseum in Amsterdam. His cabinet was very popular and several books mentioned it or had it as a subject, including Houbraken in his Schouburgh when he claimed it held portraits of over 100 people (Houbraken was writing in 1712).

History of the book
The most notable book was published by the man who purchased his collection after Van Halen died in 1732, Michiel de Roode. De Roode published the book in 1773 as a member of Leiden's learned society ‘Kunst wordt door arbeid verkreegen’ (art is accomplished by work) which paid for the edition. That the book was popular is attested by the fact that in 1808 the Teyler's Stichting gave Wybrand Hendriks the request to purchase it for up to 500 guilders at auction, and Hendriks bought it for 200 guilders.

An incomplete list of poet portraits:

References

Pan Poëticon Batavum on Google books with list of names
 Pan Poëticon Batavum by Lambert Bidloo in the DBNL

1773 books
Rijksmuseum Amsterdam
Dutch paintings
Portrait art